Joost Meendering (born 26 June 1997) is a Dutch football player who plays for ODIN '59.

Club career
He made his professional debut in the Eerste Divisie for Jong FC Utrecht on 17 February 2017 in a game against Fortuna Sittard.

On 2 March 2019 it was confirmed, that Meendering had joined ODIN '59.

References

External links
 

1997 births
Living people
Dutch footballers
Jong FC Utrecht players
Eerste Divisie players
Netherlands youth international footballers
Association football goalkeepers
ODIN '59 players
AFC '34 players
FC Volendam players
AFC Ajax players
HVV Hollandia players
AVV Swift players